The Silver State Diamond Challenge is a Minor League Baseball rivalry between Nevada's two Triple-A baseball teams, the Las Vegas Aviators and the Reno Aces of the Pacific Coast League (PCL). The rivalry began in 2009 when the Aces joined the PCL as members of the Pacific Conference Southern Division along with the Aviators, who were known as the Las Vegas 51s at the time.

The winner of the regular season series between Las Vegas and Reno receives the Silver Plate Trophy, a silver replica of a home plate with an image of the state of Nevada and markings of the locations of Las Vegas and Reno on the left, while the opposite side lists the winner of the series for each year.

In the event of a tie series, the defending champion from the previous season retains the trophy. The only exception to this rule was in the first season, which ended in a tie. To determine the inaugural champion, the mayors of each city met to draw cards to break the tie. A card draw occurred at Aces Ballpark in downtown Reno with Las Vegas mayor Oscar Goodman drawing a 7, while Reno mayor Bob Cashell drew a 6, giving the 51s the Silver Plate Trophy for 2009.

All-time series results

2009

2010

2011

References

External links 
Article about the rivalry including a picture of the Silver Plate Trophy

2009 establishments in Nevada
Baseball rivalries
Las Vegas Aviators
Recurring sporting events established in 2009
Reno Aces
Sports rivalries in the United States